Ampelocissus africana is a type of vine that is woody, or liana of the grape family, bearing edible fruit. It is native to habitats in, and around forested areas in Guinea, Ivory Coast, Nigeria, Cameroon, Chad, Central African Republic, Sudan, Kenya, Rwanda, Burundi, Tanzania (including the Zanzibar Archipelago, from where the type specimen was collected), Malawi, Zambia, Mozambique, Zimbabwe and Botswana. It was originally described botanically in 1790 by João de Loureiro as Botria africanus, which is the basionym for its treatment here under Ampelocissus.

References

External links
 

africana
Plants described in 1790
Flora of Botswana
Flora of Burkina Faso
Flora of Burundi
Flora of Cameroon
Flora of the Central African Republic
Flora of Chad
Flora of Guinea
Flora of Ivory Coast
Flora of Kenya
Flora of Malawi
Flora of Mozambique
Flora of Nigeria
Flora of Rwanda
Flora of Sudan
Flora of Tanzania
Flora of the Zanzibar Archipelago
Flora of Zambia
Flora of Zimbabwe